Boonty is a global supplier of digital distribution services for online and PC gaming whose technology platform and brand names were acquired by digital commerce provider Nexway in January 2009.

The company's white label casual game platform was utilized by over 100 million customers worldwide at the time of the Nexway acquisition, including Internet portals, ISPs, and mobile operators.

Boonty operated its own branded destination sites, Boonty.com (which is still operated by Nexway) in localized versions for the United States, France, UK, Belgium, Italy, Sweden, Norway, Denmark, Japan, Korea, Mexico, Austria, Australia, Taiwan, Hong Kong, Germany, Portugal, Finland, Singapore, The Netherlands, and Spain.

Corporate history
2001: Boonty is founded by the brothers Mathieu and Romain Nouzareth.
October 2006: Boonty announces the acquisition of Beijing-based casual game developer Gamehub.
February 2007: Boonty launches Cafe.com for free multiplayer social casual games.
May 2007: Boonty acquires the Chinese Game Studio GameHub and opens Boonty China.
July 2007: BoontyBox is launched for Windows and Macintosh computers.
October 2008: Boonty launches Facebook app iscool.
December 2008: The company decides to sells its Digital Distribution Platform and the brand name Boonty to digital commerce provider Nexway.
January 2009: Boonty is acquired by Nexway.

References

Further reading

External links
Nexway corporate site
Nexway Games corporate site
Boonty consumer site
RSS Feed Boonty US
Mathieu Nouzareth website
Romain Nouzareth website

Video game companies of France
Online companies of France
Multinational companies